Fortune is an American multinational business magazine headquartered in New York City. It is published by Fortune Media Group Holdings, owned by Thai businessman Chatchaval Jiaravanon. The publication was founded by Henry Luce in 1929. The magazine competes with Forbes and Bloomberg Businessweek in the national business magazine category and distinguishes itself with long, in-depth feature articles.

The magazine regularly publishes ranked lists, including the Fortune 500, a ranking of companies by revenue that it has published annually since 1955. The magazine is also known for its annual Fortune Investor's Guide.

History
Fortune was founded by Time magazine co-founder Henry Luce in 1929 as "the Ideal Super-Class Magazine", a "distinguished and de luxe" publication "vividly portraying, interpreting and recording the Industrial Civilization". Briton Hadden, Luce's business partner, was not enthusiastic about the idea – which Luce originally thought to title Power – but Luce went forward with it after Hadden's sudden death on February 27, 1929.

In late October 1929, the Wall Street Crash of 1929 occurred, marking the onset of the Great Depression. In a memo to the Time Inc. board in November 1929, Luce wrote: "We will not be over-optimistic. We will recognize that this business slump may last as long as an entire year." The publication made its official debut in February 1930. Its editor was Luce, managing editor Parker Lloyd-Smith, and art director Thomas Maitland Cleland.
Single copies of the first issue cost US$1 ($ in ). An urban legend says that Cleland mocked up the cover of the first issue with the $1 price because no one had yet decided how much to charge; the magazine was printed before anyone realized it, and when people saw it for sale, they thought that the magazine must really have worthwhile content. In fact, there were 30,000 subscribers who had already signed up to receive that initial 184-page issue. By 1937, the number of subscribers had grown to 460,000, and the magazine had turned half million dollars in annual profit.

At a time when business publications were little more than numbers and statistics printed in black and white, Fortune was an oversized 11" × 14", using creamy heavy paper, and art on a cover printed by a special process. Fortune was also noted for its photography, featuring the work of Margaret Bourke-White, Ansel Adams, and others. Walker Evans served as its photography editor from 1945 to 1965.

During the Great Depression, the magazine developed a reputation for its social conscience, for Walker Evans and Margaret Bourke-White's color photographs, and for a team of writers including James Agee, Archibald MacLeish, John Kenneth Galbraith, and Alfred Kazin, hired specifically for their writing abilities. The magazine became an important leg of Luce's media empire; after the successful launch of Time in 1923 and Fortune in 1930, Luce went on to launch Life in 1936 and Sports Illustrated in 1954.

From its launch in 1930 to 1978, Fortune was published monthly. In January 1978, it began publishing biweekly. In October 2009, citing declining advertising revenue and circulation, Fortune began publishing every three weeks. As of 2018, Fortune is published 14 times a year.

Marshall Loeb was named managing editor in 1986. During his tenure at Fortune, Loeb was credited with expanding the traditional focus on business and the economy with added graphs, charts, and tables, as well as the addition of articles on topics such as executive life and social issues connected to the world of business, including the effectiveness of public schools and on homelessness.

During the years when Time Warner owned Time Inc., Fortune articles (as well as those from Money magazine) were hosted at CNNMoney.com.

In June 2014, after Time Inc. spun off from its corporate parent, Fortune launched its own website at Fortune.com.

On November 26, 2017, it was announced that Meredith Corporation would acquire Time Inc. in a $2.8 billion deal. The acquisition was completed on January 31, 2018.

On November 9, 2018, it was announced that Meredith Corporation was selling Fortune to Thai billionaire Chatchaval Jiaravanon for $150 million.  Jiaravanon is affiliated with the Thailand-based conglomerate Charoen Pokphand Group, which has holdings in agriculture, telecommunications, retail, pharmaceutical, and finance.

Since March 4, 2020, access to Fortune.com has been restricted by a paywall.

Lists
Fortune regularly publishes ranked lists. In the human resources field, for example, it publishes a list of the Best Companies to Work For. Lists include companies ranked in order of gross revenue and business profile, as well as business leaders:

Fortune 500
Fortune 1000
Fortune Global 500
Fortune India 500
40 Under 40
Fortune Most Powerful Women Entrepreneurs
100 Best Companies to Work For
World's Most Admired Companies
100 Fastest Growing Companies
The Unicorn List
Businessperson of the Year
Change the World
The World's 50 Greatest Leaders
The Ledger 40 Under 40
Future 50
100 Best Workplaces For Millennials
100 Best Workplaces For Women
50 Best Workplaces for New College Graduates
Best Workplaces for Diversity

Editors 
There have been 19 top editors since Fortune was conceived in 1929. Following the elimination of the editor-in-chief role at Time Inc. in October 2013, the top editor's title was changed from "managing editor" to "editor" in 2014.

 Parker Lloyd-Smith (1929–1931)
 Ralph Ingersoll (1932–1935)
 Eric Hodgins (1935–1937)
 Russell Davenport (1937–1940)
 Richardson Wood (1940–1941)
 Ralph D. "Del" Paine, Jr. (1941–1953)
 Hedley Donovan (1953–1959)
 Duncan Norton-Taylor (1959–1965)
 Louis Banks (1965–1970)
 Robert Lubar (1970–1980)
 William S. Rukeyser (1980–1986)
 Marshall Loeb (1986–1994)
 Walter Kiechel III (1994–1995)
 John Huey (1995–2001)
 Richard "Rik" Kirkland (2001–2005)
 Eric Pooley (2005–2006)
 Andrew "Andy" Serwer (2006–2014)
 Alan Murray (2014–2017)
 Clifton Leaf (2017 to present)

See also

 Fortune Battle of the Corporate Bands, an annual music competition for amateur company-sponsored bands
 List of United States magazines

Footnotes

Further reading

 James S. Miller, "White-Collar Excavations: Fortune Magazine and the Invention of the Industrial Folk". American Periodicals. vol. 13 (2003), pp. 84–104. In JSTOR

External links
 
 

 
Business magazines published in the United States
Monthly magazines published in the United States
English-language magazines
Magazines established in 1929
Magazines published in New York City
1929 establishments in New York (state)
Magazines formerly owned by Meredith Corporation
Biweekly magazines published in the United States